Holiday is a 2018 internationally co-produced drama film directed by Isabella Eklöf and produced by David B. Sørensen. It was screened in the World Cinema Dramatic Competition section at the 2018 Sundance Film Festival. The film won four Bodil Awards, including Best Danish Film.

Plot
Michael is a drug dealer who takes his friends, including younger girlfriend Sascha, on a vacation to Bodrum in the Turkish Riviera. There, they engage in activities such as sunbathing and enjoying the water park. While visiting an ice cream shop, Sascha meets two Dutch men, Frederik and Tomas, and speaks with them informally. Sascha and her friends go to a restaurant for dinner and she spots the Dutch men again and speaks to them. She meets Tomas one night and shares drugs with him. When one of his men, Musse, shows up at the house, Michael viciously beats him, fearing the police could have followed Musse to him. Still raging he rapes Sascha, an attack which is witnessed by an unknown party in the house, who does nothing to intervene. Michael realizes the drug deals have been a success, and handsomely rewards Musse.

Alone, Sascha visits the nearby harbour where she spots the Dutch flag on one of the boats and realizes it must be Tomas'. She joins the two Dutch men on the boat for drinks when Michael happens upon them. Jealous, Michael introduces himself as Sascha's employer and boards the boat to join the small party. Tomas speaks about how he left his house for the boat and how it helped his "soul"; Michael is skeptical about this story and suggests Tomas is looking for sex. When Michael and Sascha walk home, Michael interrogates her about how she knows Tomas and how many times they have met. At the house, Michael finds Tomas on Sascha's phone contact list and calls him, inviting him for steaks on the pretense that Michael wants to consult Tomas about buying a boat. The three have dinner and go into the house, where Michael questions Tomas further on his sexual interest in Sascha. When Tomas indicates he has none, Michael tells him that is best and orders him out of the house, under threat of harm.

Sascha visits Tomas' boat once again, with bruises around her neck. Tomas realizes Michael is abusive, but accidentally falls over into his boat. Annoyed, he tells her she and her friends will all be dead or in prison in a few years and he will not be taking her away on his boat. During Tomas' rant, Sascha snaps, picks up a glass jug and hits Tomas over the head with it, killing him. She then throws the jug into the sea. She stops by the Turkish police station, but feels unable to communicate with them and leaves. The next day, at the entrance to the pontoon where the boat is moored, Sascha is located. Meanwhile, in the background, two of Michael's men are removing items from Tomas' boat in black bags. Sascha intercepts Tomas' friend and lies about being stood up by Tomas, saying she has been waiting for him for two hours. They walk off together. In the final scene Sascha is seemingly happy on a luxury boat with Michael and friends, as if nothing has happened.

Cast
Victoria Carmen Sonne as Sascha
Lai Yde as Michael
Thijs Römer as Tomas
Yuval Segal as Bobby
Bo Brønnum as Bo
Adam Ild Rohweder as Musse
Morten Hemmingsen as Jens
Mill Jober as Maria
Laura Kjær as Tanja
Stanislav Sevcik as Karsten
Saxe Rankenberg Frey as Emil
Michiel de Jong as Frederik

Reception

Critical response
On Rotten Tomatoes the film has an approval rating of  based on reviews from  critics. The site's critical consensus reads, "Holiday is challenging, but filmgoers interested in taboo-testing cinema should find this one picture whose provocations are justified by a genuinely meaningful story."

Accolades

References

External links
 
 
 
 

2018 films
2018 drama films
Danish drama films
Dutch drama films
Swedish drama films
2010s Danish-language films
Films about the illegal drug trade
Films about vacationing
Films set in Turkey
Best Danish Film Bodil Award winners
2010s Swedish films